The following is the broad timeline for major events in the Papua conflict.

1960s to 1990s 

 July 1965: Raids against Indonesian soldiers and barracks in Manokwari known as Arfai incident, resulting in reprisal and suppression campaigns (Sadar Operation).
 July–August 1969: Act of Free Choice (Indonesian: Penentuan Pendapat Rakyat, abbreviated as PEPERA) determines Western New Guinea as sovereign territory of Indonesia.
 June 1971: Henk de Mari reported that 55 men from two villages in North Biak were forced to dig their own graves before being shot. Published in Dutch daily De Telegraaf Oct 1974.
 Unknown: 500 Papuan corpses were found in jungle Lereh District, south west of Sentani Airport, Jayapura region.
 1974: In North Biak, 45 Papuans were killed.
 1975: In Biak, at least 41 peoples from Arwam and Rumbin villages were killed.
 1976: A major operation was launched by the Indonesian Army against OPM bases in Jayapura Regency. Over 400 Indonesian soldiers and 1,600 Papuans (fighters and civilians) were reportedly killed.
 1977: Aerial bombing of Akimuga (McMoRan Exploration Co. mine area).
 1977–78: Aerial bombing of Baliem Valley.
 Apr 1978: Six unidentifiable bodies were discovered in the Dosai district of Jayapura.
 May 1978: Five OPM leaders surrendered to save the village they were caught in. They were beaten to death with red hot iron bars and their bodies thrown into a pit latrine. The 125 villagers were then machine gunned as suspected OPM sympathisers.
 June 1978: 14 corpses found shot, West of Sentani Airport, Jayapura region.
 Unknown: North Biak, 12 people were shot after receiving permission to leave camp to collect sago for a village feast.
 1981: 10 Papuans were killed, and 58 disappeared without trace in Paniai Region.
 Jun–Aug 1981: Operasi Sapu Bersih (Clean Sweep Operation); population of Ampas-Waris and Batte-Arso villages were bayoneted and left for dead.
 July 1984: Naval, air, and ground troop assault of Nagasawa/Ormo Kecil village; 200 were killed.
 Unknown: Naval shelling of Taronta, Takar, and Masi-Masi coastal villages; the survivors fled towards Jayapura; under Dutch rule in 1950 each village had a population of 1500 to 2000.
 1986–87: 34 were killed in Paniai/Wissel Lake District.
This triggered the Mapenduma hostage crisis (two hostages died) and the 1996 Timika shooting incident on 15 April (14–16 died).
 15 May 1996: Mapenduma hostage crisis ends with the raid on OPM base in Geselama, Mimika, by Kopassus.
 6 July 1998: Papuan civilians demonstrating for the independence of West Papua on the Biak Island was killed in a coordinated attack by the Indonesian military and police. Large numbers of demonstrators were detained, many unarmed civilians were tortured and killed, and their bodies dumped at sea in the massacre.

2000s 

 6 October 2000: As police raided a flag-raising ceremony in Wamena, two non-Papuans were killed in unclear circumstances. A riot began and moved to a neighbourhood of migrants from outside of Papua, burning and looting shops. Seven Papuans were shot and twenty-four non-Papuans killed.
 11 November 2001: Two weeks after rejecting the autonomy law as soon as it had passed, the chairman of the Papua Presidium Council, Theys Eluay, was found murdered in his car outside Jayapura after he had been kidnapped.
 31 August 2002: Gunmen attacked a group of American school teachers and local employees on a sightseeing trip. Three teachers were killed, two Americans and one Indonesian; and seven Americans and an Indonesian girl were wounded, including the six-year-old daughter of two of the teachers. Indonesian officials placed responsibility on the OPM; a spokesman for the group denied involvement.
 4 April 2003 – 2003 Wamena incident: Following a raid on an Indonesian military armory which killed 2 soldiers, around 7,000 civilians were forcefully relocated and around 50 died.
 5 November 2003: OPM faction leader Yustinus Murib was killed along with 9 other OPM members near Yalengga in a raid by 60 TNI personnel. SBS Dateline aired a story the day he died featuring him pleading for international intervention from a video tape received days before.
 1 December 2003: A group of 500 people hoisted the separatist flag, several other actions took place, 42 people were arrested.
 15 January 2004: Journalist Mark Worth found dead in hotel in Sentani two days after the ABC announced his documentary, Land of the Morning Star, would premier on Australian screens in February 2004
 15 October 2004: Papuan rebels killed six civilians in an attack in Puncak Jaya.
 13 February 2006: Formal establishment of Barisan Merah Putih which is a coalescing of earlier formed native pro-Indonesia groups. These includes Indonesian Irian Youth Movement (GAPII), Red and White Movement (GMP), Council for the Determination of the Liberation of West Irian (Council for the Determination PEPERA/ DMP), People's Three Command (Trikora), West Irian Veteran Organization, and West Irian Diplomatic Veteran Group in the United Nations.
 16 March 2006: Three policemen and an airman were killed and 24 other people injured during a clash with Papuan students who had been demanding closure of Freeport's Grasberg mine in Papua.
 9 August 2008: In Wamena, one man, Opinus Tabuni (a distant relative of Buchtar Tabuni), was killed when Indonesian security forces opened fire in response to the raising of the banned Morning Star flag by activists at a large rally organised by DAP (Dewan Adat Papua – Papuan Customary Council) marking the UN-declared International Day of the World's Indigenous People.
 4 December 2008: Four Papuans were wounded by gunfire from the police at a demonstration for the independence of West Papua.
 29 January 2009: At least five Papuans were wounded by shots fired by police during a demonstration.
 14 March 2009: One Indonesian Army soldier was killed during an attack against a security post in Tingginambut. The OPM was blamed.
 8 April 2009: Several bombs exploded against a bridge and a refinery on the island of Biak. One person was killed.
 11–12 April 2009: Fighting between the army and the Papuan resistance left eleven dead, including six members of the security forces. At the same time, a bomb was defused beside a police station in Biak.
 15 April 2009: An attack against a convoy of police in Tingginambut killed one and wounded six. The OPM was blamed.
 11 July 2009: An employee of Freeport-McMoRan Copper & Gold Inc.’s Indonesian unit was shot dead in an attack outside the company's mine in Papua.
 July 2009: OPM members hoisted the flag of West Papua in the village of Jugum. Afterwards more than thirty houses were burned by the Indonesian army.
 16 December 2009: Free Papua Movement (OPM) leader Kelly Kwalik was shot by Indonesian police during a raid in Timika and died in Timika Hospital.

2010s 

 24 January 2010: Rebels ambushed a convoy of mining company PT Freeport McMoRan employees. Nine peoples were injured; OPM denied responsibility.
 1 March 2010: The Australian West Papua Association in Sydney said that the situation in West Papua was deteriorating. Since the previous July there had been fourteen incidents of shootings around the Grasberg mine, Freeport's copper and gold mine. The attacks had killed at least three and injured thirteen.
 23 March 2010: Rebels attacked an Indonesian military convoy, injuring some of the soldiers.
 May 2010 : The OPM were suspected of killing three workers at a construction site. In retaliation the Indonesian military raided a village leaving at least two dead and a woman raped, while houses in three villages were burned by the military.
 17 May 2010: The army attacked a base of OPM killing one suspected militant.
 21 May 2010: Militants attacked members of the Indonesian army near Yambi, 75 km from Mulia. No casualties were reported.
 15 June 2010: An officer of the Indonesian elite police was shot dead during a patrol. Eight firearms were also stolen by the rebels.
 July 2010: Twelve houses and two churches were destroyed and a woman was raped during an Indonesian army operation to capture Goliath Tabuni.
 23 June 2011: A police officer from Jayapura was shot by alleged members of the Free Papua Movement.
 6 July 2011: Three soldiers were shot during a clash with unknown attackers in Kalome village, Tingginambut district.
 20 July 2011: An Indonesian soldier was killed in an ambush against a military security squad in Puncak Jaya district in Papua.
 31 July 2011: Rebels attacked a car in Papua with guns, axes and knives killing one soldier and three civilians and also wounding seven; OPM denied responsibility.
 1 August 2011: The National Police said that members of the Free Papua Movement killed four civilians near Tanjakan Gunung Merah, Paniai.
 2 August 2011: A soldier guarding a military post in Tingginambut was shot dead. In the town of Mulia two shootings targeted the police and military, injuring one soldier.
 3 August 2011: Separatists shot at an army helicopter as it evacuated the body of a soldier they had allegedly killed.
 22 October 2011: Al Jazeera published footage of an independence gathering that was attacked by Indonesian security forces. At least five people were killed.
 2 December 2011: An officer from Jayapura Police office was found dead next to a river after he was allegedly slain by a group wielding arrows and daggers. OPM was blamed.
 5 December 2011: Two policemen were killed in Puncak Jaya during an exchange of gunfire with suspected members of the Free Papua Movement. 
 12 December 2011: Police attacked the headquarters of a local cell of the OPM. The police seized firearms, ammunition, knives, combat gear, documents, and Morning Star flags, and killed 14 militants.
 In 2012, West Papuan National Committee's (KNPB) Chairman Mako Tabuni died in hospital after sustaining a shooting injury during an arrest attempt by the Jayapura police department.
 22 February 2013: A military helicopter was damaged by ground fire while attempting to remove the bodies of soldiers killed fighting the OPM earlier. At least three members of the crew were injured. Eight Indonesian soldiers were killed in fighting around the same time.
 26 December 2013: Gerald Little (an Australian) was sentenced to seven months in prison in Australia for attempting to fight with the OPM. Little was arrested in December 2012 at Brisbane airport by police. Little who had no military training, combat experience or espionage training at the time travelled to Ukraine in August 2012 for a five-day training course run by a private military contractor, the International Bodyguard Association (IBA). The Judge described Little as delusional. Little had been in email communication with the OPM.
 7 April 2014: A border post between Papua New Guinea and Indonesia was damaged and the border crossing temporally closed after a shoot out between the Indonesian Military and "armed civilians". Papua New Guinea local media reported that OPM fighters may have fired from the New Guinea side of the border and were dressed in blue berets to resemble United Nations personnel. No casualties were reported.
 18 September 2014: In a fire fight between Indonesian Security forces and around thirty OPM members at an airfield in the Lanny jaya district, an OPM member was killed and several people wounded. The group of OPM fighters were suspected to be responsible for shooting dead two policemen in July.
 13 October 2014: An individual carrying equipment and a large amount of ammunition was apprehended at Sentani airport. The illegal items were found during a routine X-ray after which the suspect attempted escape but was apprehended 200m from the airport. Items seized included 112 5.56-calibre bullets, 20 .56-calibre bullet casings, 13 9-calibre bullets and a single 7.6-calibre cartridge. The police also seized one weapon and a Nokia mobile phone. Earlier, the Papua Police managed to confiscate dozens of home-made weapons and rounds of ammunition during a raid on the OPM's local headquarters. A policeman involved said; "As many as 20 rounds of Mauser ammunition, five home-made weapons, one motorcycle and striped uniforms were confiscated during the raid,".
 8 December 2014: in the Bloody Paniai case, four youths were killed and 10 to 21 others were injured during an incident in the Paniai district. Government officials said a few hundred protesters attacked local military and police posts, while rights activists accused the military of shooting at unarmed people after several smaller incidents earlier in the day.
 24 March 2015: General Goliath Tabuni and 23 of his followers surrendered to the Indonesian army in Tingginambut, Puncak Jaya.
 9 September 2015: Four woodcutters were attacked by armed militants near the border with Papua New Guinea. One of them was killed. Another one was injured while the remaining two were taken hostage and brought to Papua New Guinea. OPM claimed the attack, and stated that they demand prisoner exchange with their two comrades who were arrested. The Indonesian government appealed for help to the Papua New Guinean government. The two hostages was released on 18 September 2015, after the militants were arrested by the Papua New Guinea Defence Force.
 26 January 2016: Ten militants surrendered to the Indonesian Army in Puncak Jaya. They used to be the followers of Goliath Tabuni, who surrendered in 2015. The government is planning to give them amnesty.
 May 2016: Mass demonstrations in support of the United Liberation Movement for West Papua and its efforts to join the Melanesian Spearhead Group began in early May and continued throughout the month. Indonesian police responded by arresting thousands of demonstrators.
 24 March 2017: 154 guerrilla fighters in Papua province have surrendered to the Indonesian government in a ceremony in Puncak district, the Indonesian army said in a statement.
 28 March 2017: A West Papuan man who was suspected by authorities as an armed separatist leader was shot dead by the Indonesian police.
 22 October 2017: A National Police Mobile Brigade officer was shot and killed in Mimika near the Freeport Grasberg mine with an TPNPB unit taking responsibility who were being pursued after they shot at Freeport mine vehicles on 24 September. Police suspected that the TPNPB used Steyr assault rifles. On 21 October, the TPNPB had declared an area near the mine as a battlefield including the villages of Banti and Kimbeli.
 November 2017 – Mimika blockade:
 9 November 2017: The military claimed that migrant workers from Indonesia's Sulawesi island in Banti and Kimbeli villages were being held hostage by the TPNPB which was disputed by an Indonesian government minister who said they had been "isolated" by the fighting. The TPNPB denied there were non-native hostages. The TPNPB earlier stated if the military or police take reprisals against innocent Papuans then reciprocal will be done to immigrants residing in PT Freeport area.
 15 November 2017: A National Police Mobile Brigade officer was shot and killed in Mimika with an TPNPB unit taking responsibility. Two TPNPB were injured in gunfire on 17 November. Freeport temporarily shut the main supply route to its Grasberg mine complex. A civilian employee of a catering service provider within Freeport died in suspicious circumstances whilst travelling to his village.
 17 November 2017: Indonesian police and military evacuated more than 340 Sulawesi migrants from the villages of Banti and Kimbeli. The police stated there was an exchange of gunfire with the TPNPB. Freeport began evacuating mine workers families from the mining town of Tembagapura. Shots had been fired on a Freeport vehicle and two large mining trucks set on fire.
12–15 July 2018: A series of gunfights were reported between the wing of the Free West Papua Movement and Indonesian security forces. No casualties were reported.
3–17 October 2018: OPM rebel group under Egianus Kogoya leadership had taken 15 migrant teachers and medical workers as hostage for 14 days. One of hostages is reported alternately raped by OPM rebel group. This caused many migrant teachers and medical workers were averse to be returned at Nduga, Papua.
2 December 2018: At least 19 workers constructing a bridge at Trans Papua projects were killed by an armed group linked to the West Papua Liberation Organization. One Indonesian soldier is also killed on a separate incident. This event is also known as Nduga massacre.
28 January 2019: A Kostrad soldier guarding an airport in Nduga was killed and another was injured following a firefight.
7 March 2019: 25 TNI soldiers guarding construction of the Trans-Papua road engaged in a firefight with West Papua National Liberation Army (TPNPB) personnel. TNI spokesmen claimed that 3 soldiers were killed while 7 Liberation Army personnel were killed.
2 May 2019: a Polish far-right nationalist Jakub Skrzypski was sentenced to five years in prison for intent to, and preparation to, commit treason. Skrzypski had meetings with the KNPB, which the prosecution argued was a banned organisation, and replied to a mobile phone text message on sourcing weapons from a KNPB member. He is the first foreigner to be convicted of treason in Indonesia. Three of the four police charges were dropped during his trial. He denied he committed treason claiming he was a tourist and it was a show trial.
10 July 2019: A human rights group advocating for West Papuans in Indonesia says there were more than 23 extrajudicial killings by the military there last year.
12 August 2019: An undercover National Police Criminal Investigation officer was abducted in Usir in Puncak Jaya Regency and later shot dead that day nearby allegedly by a unit led by Lekagak Telenggen after dialogue with the National Police.
16 August 2019: A TNI Toyota Hilux travelling on the Trans-Papua Highway in Jayawijaya Regency was ambushed allegedly by a unit led by Egianus Kogoya injuring two soldiers with one later dying in hospital the following day.
2019 Papua protests: 
 19–21 August 2019: Violent protests in Papua's large cities with several demonstrations over three days, which numbered from in the hundreds to the thousands, following a racist incident on Saturday 17 August with Papuan students in a dormitory in the Indonesian province of East Java at Surabaya involving the TNI and Police. 10 government buildings in Manokwari and 15 government buildings in Sorong were destroyed. Indonesia throttled the internet to prevent access to social media in protest areas and from 21 August blocked the internet in Papua. The Morning Star flag was flown in several protests along with protesters crying "Free Papua". Indonesia sent 1200 Police and 300 TNI reinforcements to Papua.
 22 August 2019: Protest in Jakarta where demonstrators flew the banned Morning Star flag in front of the Presidential palace singing songs with lyrics demanding Papuan independence.
 23 August 2019: Indonesian National Police and Municipal Police were involved in a gun fight at Wamena in Jayawijaya Regency allegedly by a unit led by Egianus Kogoya which suffered a fatality with a National Police officer and Municipal Police officer both shot in the leg.
 30 August 2019: Protesters in the eastern region set buildings on fire in the provincial capital of Jayapura. The police fired tear gas to disperse thousands of demonstrators.
 24 September 2019: Student protests of alleged racism incident happened in Wamena followed by riots when Kelion Tahuni, a student was shot. Bodies were later found under burned buildings as rioters burn some of the buildings, mostly belonging to non-Papuan migrants according to the Indonesian police. Indonesian police said the death toll had risen to 33 with 8 victims were Papuans and that rebel sympathizers had burned buildings and set fire to vehicles. Some of the Indonesian police's version of these events has subsequently been questioned in an investigative article by two Jakarta Post journalists in which the Papuan victims likely to be higher. Based on testimony of the residents of Hom-hom, they did not recognize the arsonist, which wore high school clothes, and suspect they are not Papuan from Wamena and look too old. The police later confirmed probably they were Papuan armed groups who infiltrated the student protests. The inciting incidents of a teacher remarking a racist comment toward one of the students was later confirmed to be false, by deputy principal of the school. Students from other school receiving the news through messages of the incident. Lukas Enembe, Papuan governor, confirmed one incident where a Papuan student was doused by gasoline and burned for not participating in the riots, the victim was confirmed to be from SMP 1 state junior high school, and remarked the riots were engineered. Another story emerged from SMA 1 state high school from three native Papuans teachers, of student rioters from other school invading the school and inciting the students to riots and throwing stones and hurting some students. The papuan victims of the incident likely to be as high as 17 with 11 people verified dead (3 people were in the Papuan customary list but not on the police list), the police did not confirm if they shot toward the crowd and possibly hitting Kelion Tabuni, but he was later confirmed to be one of the victims. There were many native Wamena Papuans protecting migrants from the rioters and arsonists, as confirmed by regional La Pago customary council chief Dominikus Surabut, who expressed sorry for not being able to help everyone. The protest spread to other cities, and police said hundreds of university students were being questioned about a protest in Jayapura in which a soldier and three civilians were killed. However much of the unrest was in the city of Wamena.
17 December 2019: Two soldiers were killed in a shootout with members of West Papua National Liberation Army in Sugapa district. The soldiers were deployed to the region as part of a joint military and police security task force.

2020s 
9 October 2020: A joint civilian and security forces investigative team tasked by the Coordinating Minister for Political, Legal, and Security Affairs of Indonesia, was investigating the death of a local priest who was killed on 19 September when they came under fire from hostile militias in Intan Jaya Regency. One of the civilian investigator was injured in the arm along with two other army personnel.
November 2020: UN human rights office said they were concerned with the escalating violence in Papua & West Papua province. As per the report by OHCHR, military, security forces and nationalist militias are involved in the violence, extrajudicial killings and torture of the protesters and human rights defenders. Spokesperson for the Office of the High Commissioner said Indonesian authorities should pursue thorough, independent and impartial investigations into all acts of violence, in particular killings, and ensure all perpetrators were held to account, regardless of their affiliation.
8 January 2021: Papuan Separatist Group (TPNPB/OPM) admitted that they shot a civilian helicopter and burned an aircraft on Wednesday (6/1). Both aircraft were piloted by foreigners and carried civilian passengers.
10 January 2021: Pvt. 2nd Class Agus Kurniawan that served in TNI AD 400th Infantry Battalion was shot and killed after Papuan Separatist Group (OPM/TPNPB) attacked his post in Titigi, Intan Jaya, West Papua.
12 January 2021: Papuan Separatist Group (TPNPB/OPM) burned two BTS. Their justification: "We don't accept Indonesian Government facilities in Papua, we don't need communication network"
22 January 2021: 2 KIA from the Papuan Separatist Group (OPM/TPNPB) attack: Pvt 1st Class Roy Vebrianto killed in Titigi and Pvt 1st Class Dedi Hamdani killed when chasing Titigi attackers. Both served in TNI AD 400th Inf Batt.
30 January 2021: Local pastors confirmed that Papuan Separatist Group (TPNPB/OPM) captured and executed one civilian named Boni Bagau in Agapa Village, Sugapa District, Papua. They accused Bagau for being 'a spy' for government forces.
8 February 2021: A 32-year-old civilian named Ramli RN was shot in the face in front of his wife by the Papuan Separatist Group (OPM/TPNPB). TPNPB's Sabinus Waker Group has claimed responsibility for the attack as they accused Ramli of being TNI/Polri spy.
10 February 2021: a brief gun battle broke out between the TNI and OPM forces in Unggul Bridge, Puncak Regency, West Papua. No injuries reported.
12 February 2021: One Army TNI AD soldier, Chief Pvt. Hendra Sipayung, was shot in the head after TPNPB/OPM conduct a hit n run attack using motorcycles in Sugapa District. Sipayung survived and was evacuated to Jayapura for advanced treatment.
9 February 2021: One civilian (ojek/taxi bike driver) named Rusman Heidar was stabbed and killed by TPNPB/OPM in Ilaga District, West Papua. TPNPB/OPM has claimed responsibility for the attack, saying that the civilian was government spy.
15 February 2021: Pvt. 2nd Class Ginanjar from TNIAD 400th IB was shot and killed after Papuan Separatist Group (OPM/TPNPB) attacked his post in Mamba Village, Sugapa District.
13 April 2021: The West Papua National Liberation Army has claimed responsibility for shooting dead 2 teacher in Beoga district. The groups was likely lead by Sabinus Waker and Lekagag Telenggen, the first shooting happened on 8 April afternoon, killing Octavianus Rayo, 3 rooms of SMAN 1 Beoga was burned. On 11 April a further 9 rooms were burned. Yonathan Randen, another teacher, was shot later when trying to retrieve the previous victim body. Both bodies were held for ransom, and was released after the local Puncak district paid. Both teachers were shot because they were suspected to be from the military. Indonesian government sometimes used military personnels as teachers  in Indonesia to mitigate teacher shortage, both victims are later confirmed to be civilians, though Oktavianus Rayo was commonly seen carrying a hangun when working as a seller.
16 April 2021: Ali Mom (16), a local Papuan high school student, was shot and his head was slashed by TPNPB in Ilaga. This was confirmed by Lekagak Telenggen, he accused the boy as intel for Indonesian military.
17 April 2021: There was an arson attack on the house of Dambet village chief as well as education facilities, which includes an elementary school building in Dambet Village, Beoga, Puncak Regency. The house also functioned as village shops and kiosks for villagers. The village head from Dambet tribe, Benner Tinal, conducted a stone burning ceremony, to celebrate that there was no casualty in the arson attack. It was attended by Iqbal Al Qudusy, the local head from Operation Nemangkawi. The perpetrators was strongly suspected to be from TPNPB, as Dambet Village is only 3 km from the previous attack in Beoga district. Klemen Tinal, Papua deputy governor strongly condemn the recent attacks, and requested security personnel to restore law and order in Beoga Sub-district, Puncak District, to enable the local administration to restart its public services.
25 April 2021: The local papuan BIN head (Kabinda), Brigadier General  I Gusti Putu Danny Karya Nugraha Karya, was shot dead when inspecting Dambet village in the aftermath of recent arson attack.
2 September 2021: 30 rebels had ambushed soldiers while they were asleep at the Indonesian military post. The post is located in Kisor Village, South Aifat District, Maybrat Regency. Four soldiers—2nd Sergeant Amrosius, Chief Private Dirham, First Private Zul Ansari, and First Lieutenant Dirman—died in the attack, while two others sustained serious injuries. After the incident, several local residents had fled their homes fearing for their safety. According to the National Commission on Human Rights (Komnas HAM)-Papua Office head, Frits B. Ramandey, preliminary findings indicated that the suspects had launched a well-planned and organized attack. He also thanked Maybrat district head Bernard Sagrim for reassuring local residents following the incident persuading them to return. Besides Komnas HAM, the West Papua police also investigated the case. Eight days after the attack, the West Papua police arrested two suspects identified by their initials as MY (20) and MS (18) and launched a manhunt for 17 others. According to the police, the attack had been thoroughly planned and organized by members of the West Papua National Committee (KNPB) operating in the Kisor neighborhood of Maybrat Regency, led by Silas Ki. Six men accused of launching an attack on a military post in Maybrat Regency will be tried at the Makassar District Court.
13 September 2021: A group of TPNPB soldiers led by Lamek Taplo attacked villages in Kiriwok, Pegunungan Bintang Regency, causing injuries to security personnel and killing nurse Gabriela Meilani (22). A number of public buildings in Kiriwok such as the district office, market, teacher's houses, school, bank, doctor's houses, health worker's barracks and clinic was also set on fire, TPNPB later claimed the responsibility. From testimonies of the survivors and healthcare workers, they were harassed, stabbed, beaten and tortured. The nurses were stripped down bare naked by force using machetes, tortured, sexually abused until unconscious and then thrown off a 500 meter deep canyon. Nurses Kristina and Gabriela were found naked at a depth 500 meters deep, Kristina survived and rescued however Gabriela succumbed to her wounds and died. 9 healthcare workers survived and were evacuated to Jayapura. 31 civilians including the healthcare workers survived by seeking shelter in a military post.
5 December 2021:TPNPB Ngalum Kupel under Lamek Taplo burned down SMAN 1 Oksibil in district Serambakom, Pegunungan Bintang. Around 235 students were unable to go to school as a result. The same group was trying to burn SMKN 1 Oksibil although managed to be stopped by security forces. A video implicating the group was uploaded online.
4 March 2022: Papuan militants (OPM/TPNPB) claimed responsibility of attack on Telkomsel tower in Beoga District, Puncak Regency, killing eight people. Sebby Sambom claimed all eight victims were member of TNI and Polri. However this was denied by TNI and Polri, and confirmed by local Komnas HAM head, Frits Ramandey, that all eight victims and one survivor were workers for PT. Palapa Timur Telematika (PTT). Perpetrator of this attack are members of TPNPB under Aibon Kogeya. One survivor of the attack is Nelson Sarira, while the other eight killed victims are Bona Simanullang, Billy Garibaldi, Renaltagasye Tentua, Jamaludin, Eko Septiansyah, Syahril Nurdiansyah, Ibo, and Bebi Tabuni, the son of Dani tribal head from Gome, Ilaga District, Abeloni Tabuni, which was confirmed by Abelom Kogoya, general tribal leader of Puncak Regency, both condemned the attack.
18 June 2022: Son of footballer Pieter Rumaropen, Diego Rumaropen, a policeman was killed after helping villagers in Napua, Jayawijaya Regency, the attacker hacked his body and stole his and another officer's weapon. The attacker believed to be member of TPNPB under Egianus Kogoya, and later acknowledged by Sebby Sambom with the motive to steal weapons.
16 July 2022: KKB/TPNPB under Egianus Kogoya attacked Nonggolait village, Kenyam District, Nduga Regency, Highland Papua. The attackers opened fire on a grocer, and then shot seven traders riding on a freight truck. Four bystanders were also shot, including indigenous priest of Nonggolait from Kenyam. In total 10 civilians were killed 7 of them instantly while 3 others died later in a clinic and 2 others critically injured. The head of the National Commission on Human Rights (Komnas HAM) Representative for Papua Region, Frits Ramandey, said the KKB action against residents in Nonggolait Village was an inhumane act and had happened many times. This group is considered so cruel because it attacks residents who are completely helpless. Human rights activist and also the Executive Director of the Papuan Justice and Human Integrity Foundation, Theo Hesegem, condemned the KKB action that attacked 12 civilians in Nduga. He also argued that KKB's actions were beyond reason because it attacked residents who did not have any firearms.
19 July 2022: TPNPB/OPM under Bocor Sobolim beheaded an illegal gold miner in Kawe Village, Awinbon District, Bintang Mountains Regency, and bring the head to their HQ where they make a video recording threatening everyone else that they will kill more.
22 August 2022: The mutilated bodies of 4 Papuan civilians from Nduga Regency were found close to Timika. Their bodies had been put in sacks and thrown into the river. According to the TNI, the victims of the mutilation were TPNPB/OPM sympathizers with one victim with the initials LN confirmed to be part of the Egianus Kogoya arms and ammunition supply network. However, the victims' families and the Regent of Nduga denied and said that the victims were civilians. On 8 October, all perpetrators of the murder consisting of 6 soldiers (2 did not commit murder but received stolen money) and 4 civilians had been captured by authorities. According to authorities the victims were lured by the perpetrators to purchase AK and SS1 type rifles from the perpetrators with value of up to 250 million rupiah, but were instead murdered and the money stolen.
13 December 2022: A civilian named Yeferson Sayuri was killed by an attack by an armed criminal group (KKB) on a police convoy in the Yapen Islands. The victim who died was known to have joined the police group as a chainsaw operator.
14 December 2022: A civilian banker from Bank Papua Sinak branch, named Darius Yumame was killed as he was shot in the head by Kalenak Murib while shopping in Sinak traditional market. Police believed the perpetrators to be Kalenak Murib, member of TPNPB. Kalenak Murib was former prison escapee who joined TPNPB. He was currently under customary sanctions by Goliat Tabuni and Lekagak Telenggen, because he was known to kill recklessly.
6 January 2023: TPNPB burned down Sentani New Market in Jayapura Regency. The motive was done in order to expel Indonesian migrants living there. “TPNPB special forces burned down Sentani New Market on January 6, 2023. We burned in accordance with TPNPB’s order on December 1, 2021 that we will carry out a total revolution and expel all Indonesian immigrants in the Land of Papua,” Sambom said on Sunday, January 8, 2023, forwarding a message from TPNPB special member Dorompet Jelemaken who had burned Sentani New Market.
January 2023 — Oksibil attacks
7 January 2023: Combined TNI-Polri forces are involved in a shootout with an armed criminal group for 2 hours long.
9 January 2023: The building of state vocational school SMKN 1 Oksibil is burned by an armed criminal group at around 10:00 AM local time. They also attacked a cargo aircraft while landing from Tanah Merah, Boven Digoel Regency.
11 January 2023: 35th Regional Defense Commando of TPNPB burned a Department of Population and Civil Record (Disdukcapil) office at around 01:30 AM local time.
 7 February 2023 — Nduga hostage crisis

References 

Papua conflict
Papua conflict